Șomcuta Mare is a town in Maramureș County, Romania. The town administers seven villages: Buciumi (Törökfalu), Buteasa (Bucsonfalva), Ciolt (Csolt), Codru Butesii (Kodrulytelep), Finteușu Mare (Nagyfentős), Hovrila (Hávord) and Vălenii Șomcutei (Somkútpataka). It was declared a town in 2004.

History

The exact founding date of Șomcuta Mare is unknown; however, it is first mentioned in 1319 as part of "Cetatea de piatră" (Stone Fortress) realm. In the 14th century, the locality, along with the "Chioar Domain" enters the possession of Romanian voivodes (rulers) of the Voivodeship of Maramureș. As of 1566, the "Chioar Domain" is divided in 12 voivodeships, of which those led by voivode Dan Butean are administrated from Șomcuta Mare, covering 14 villages. In the year of 1599 Șomcuta Mare along with the remaining "Chioar Domain" is transferred to the rule of Mihai Viteazul.

In 1713 "Cetatea de piatră" is destroyed. Later, in 1738, the "Chioar Domain" is transformed into a "Ținut" (Land of), leading to an increased administrative importance of Șomcuta Mare. With the help of Gheorghe Șincai a school is founded in the year of 1784; a primary school is opened between 1835-1838 and girl school between 1867-1889.

At the end of the 19th century the locality becomes an important trading point, with well established markets. The area had 3 operating banks: "Casa de Economii a Districtului Chioar" (Savings House of Chioar District), "Casa de Economii Chioreană" (Chiorean House of Savings) and "Banca de Comerț" (Commerce Bank); as well as a train station, post office, telegraph, library and fireman house.

During the inter-war oil presses, mills, and 3 leather processing factories operate in the area as well as an agriculture school is opened. Between 1922 and 1929 a gymnasium is opened. In the years of 1930-1931 the newspaper "Chioar" is published.

After World War II, the locality reached a higher urbanisation level. Its status was changed from commune to town in 2004.

In the village of Finteușu Mare, the song "Dac-am plecat, Ardealule, din tine" is interpreted by the local male choir.

Geography
The city of Șomcuta Mare covers an area of 12,040 ha, of which:

Agricultural land: 7,949 ha
 arable land: 2,799 ha
 pastures: 1,855 ha
 hay fields: 2.585 ha
 vineyards: 5 ha
 orchards: 705 ha

Non-agricultural land: 4.091 ha
 forests: 3.177 ha
 water: 107 ha
 roads: 201 ha
 buildings: 517 ha
 vacant land: 89 ha

Demographics
Following the 2002 population census, the cities population is of 7,708 people; of which: 6,810 Romanians, 167 Hungarians, 3 Germans, 3 Italians, 1 Ukrainian, 1 Jew and 1 Serbian. Compared against the 1992 population census, the population declined from 8,079.

Natives
Ben Ferencz (b. 1920), chief prosecutor at one of the Nuremberg Trials

Tourism
 Natural Reserve "Peștera Vălenii Șomcutei" (Cave of Vălenii Șomcutei) (5 ha).

References

Populated places in Maramureș County
Towns in Romania